Jean-Pierre Ramel (the younger) (1768 in Cahors – 15 August 1815 in Toulouse) was a French general during the French Revolutionary Wars and the First French Empire. Following the defeat of Napoleon I, he was assassinated by royalists in Toulouse during the Second White Terror. His older brother, Jean-Pierre Ramel (the elder), born in 1761, had been a deputy of the French Parliament and had worked on the Constitution.

Biography
Ramel entered a French infantry regiment as a volunteer at the age of fifteen. In 1791 he became adjutant-major in the Legion of Lot. In 1792 he was promoted to captain and the next year he became a battalion commander. After being imprisoned, he obtained his liberty due to the efforts of General Dugommier and in 1796 he was promoted to adjutant-general in the army of the Rhin-et-Moselle. Charged with the defense of Kehl he successfully repulsed the attack of the Archduke Charles.

Promotion to commander and capture
The same year he was made commander of the Guard of the Legislature in which capacity he denounced the royalist conspiracy of Brottier (30 January 1797). Being suspect of royalist sympathies himself, he was disarmed by Augereau during the Coup of 18 fructidor an V (4 September 1797). Following his arrest he was conveyed to the Temple where he was imprisoned. The next day he and Pichegru, Barthélémy, Laffon de Ladebat, Barbé-Marbois were condemned and deported to the penal colonies in Guiana. In June 1798 Ramel escaped from the penal colony to Paramaribo and then to London.

After receiving permission to return to France, he was reinstated into the Consular Army and assigned to the expedition to Saint-Domingue under Rochambeau. There he was wounded and evacuated back to France. He served in the 1805 campaign under Massena in Italy and was given the command responsible for defending the Mediterranean coast. In 1809 he was employed in the gendarmerie and in 1810–1811 he fought in the campaigns in Spain and Portugal, where he distinguished himself at the siege of Astorga.

Promotion to major general
After the Bourbon Restoration, Ramel was made Maréchal de camp (major general) and awarded the Order of Saint Louis. He was given command of the department of Haute-Garonne, where he attempted to moderate the influence of reactionary political elements. Suspected of being a loyalist of the now deposed Napoleon Bonaparte, the reactionaries had him assassinated in Toulouse on 15 August 1815.

1768 births
1815 deaths
French generals
French military personnel of the French Revolutionary Wars
French military personnel of the Napoleonic Wars
Order of Saint Louis recipients
Assassinated French people